This is a list of media commentators and writers in the United Kingdom on the sport of Association football.

A number of football players have had a second career as writers or commentators. However, many commentators never played the game at a professional level such as Dale Rowlinson, Gaz Mallachan yet they have gone on to become famous names associated with the game.

Table

References 

Commentators

Football Commentators
British football